Joško is a Croatian masculine given name that may refer to the following notable people:
Joško Battestin (1918–2020), Slovene electrical engineer, inventor and author
Joško Bilić (born 1974), Croatian football player
Joško Čagalj Jole (born 1972), Croatian pop singer
Joško Domorocki (1917–1992), Bosnian-Herzegovinian football player
Joško Farac (born 1969), Croatian football defender
Joško Gluić (born 1951), Yugoslav football midfielder
Joško Gvardiol (born 2002), Croatian football defender
Joško Hajder (born 1994), Croatian football midfielder and forward
Joško Janša (1900–?), Slovenian cross-country skier
Joško Jeličić (born 1971), Croatian football midfielder
Joško Kreković (born 1969), Croatian former water polo player and coach
Joško Marušić (born 1952), Croatian illustrator and author of animated films
Joško Milenkoski volleyball coach of the Turkish national team
Joško Popović (born 1966), Croatian football striker
Joško Španjić (born 1966), Croatian football manager and former player
Joško Svaguša (born 1972), Croatian entrepreneur and politician
Joško Topić (born 1983), Croatian tennis player
Joško Vidošević (1935–1990), Croatian football forward
Joško Vlašić (born 1956), Croatian athletics coach and former decathlete

Croatian masculine given names
Slovene masculine given names